Breathless is the second studio album by English singer Shayne Ward. It was released through Syco Music in the United Kingdom on 26 November 2007. The album is mostly written by Rami Yacoub, Arnthor Birgisson and Savan Kotecha. The album was commercially successful, debuting at number two on the UK Albums Chart. It sold 95,801 units within a week of release, although ultimately less successful than its predecessor, Ward's self-titled album.

Two singles were released from the album, one of which was a Double A-side. On 31 October 2007, an official Breathless DVD, which included exclusive interviews and five music videos, was released via Woolworths stores in the UK. The album has earned a platinum certification in the United Kingdom and went five times platinum in Ireland.

Background
Ward worked on the album for nearly a year and a half, longer than he had spent on his previous solo album and The X Factor put together. Ward described the album as a more "funky, sexy and different step from him." Producers Rami Yacoub, Arnthor Birgisson, and Ryan Tedder also worked on the album. The first single from the album, "If That's OK with You" / "No U Hang Up", was released to radio on 7 September 2007. The video for "If That's OK With You" were premiered on 18 August 2007. On 14 September, the single was released physically, and the video for "No U Hang Up" was released via Channel 4 and Ward's official YouTube page. The single reached number two in the Britain and number eleven in Ireland.

The second and final single from the album was "Breathless", which was released on 19 November 2007. Television promotion included appearances on the fourth series of The X Factor on 10 November 2007 and The Paul O'Grady Show on 19 November 2007. The single entered the UK Singles Chart at No. 2 on 25 November 2007. During the release of "Breathless", it was announced that Ward was planning a six-month-long British tour to support the album. The tour started in Glasgow, Scotland on 12 May 2008 and eventually ended in Ireland on 29 December 2008, following extra dates being added. The tour visited cities such as London, Sheffield, Aberdeen and Manchester.

Reception

Commercial performance 
On 2 December 2007, the album reached number one in the Irish Albums Chart, knocking Leona Lewis's Spirit off the top. It debuted at number two in the UK Albums Chart selling 95,801 in its first week, being held off by Lewis To date it has sold over 450,000 copies in the UK.

Critical reception 

The album has received mixed reviews from music critics. Times Online gave the album three out of five stars stating "With chart battles involving producers rather than artists, poor Ward finds himself fighting it out with the big budget likes of Justin Timberlake in the sweet voice stakes." The website also commented that the album was largely ballad-free, and the gleeful If That's OK With You borrows deftly from Rihanna's "Pon De Replay". "Damaged" and a cover of the SOS Band's "Just Be Good to Me" eschew bland international R&B for the pop reggae that Ace of Base once sold by the million. Better still is "Stand by Your Side" and the soul stomper "Tangled Up", both reminiscent of George Michael's finest, could signpost his future." The BBC gave the album a mixed-to positive review, calling it "an album that sums up the predicament of the reality pop star. Having taken the fast track to the big time, Shayne has no style of his own and is open to the whims of his production team."

Track listing

Charts and certifications

Weekly charts

Year-end charts

Certifications

Release history

See also
The Breathless Tour 2008

References

Shayne Ward albums
2007 albums
Albums produced by Rami Yacoub
Albums produced by Ryan Tedder
Syco Music albums
Albums produced by Cutfather